Valentin Aleksandrovich Kotyk  (11 February 1930 – 17 February 1944) was a Soviet Pioneer and a partisan scout. He was also the youngest-ever Hero of Soviet Union.

During the German-Soviet War, he participated in the partisan movement in Ukraine. At first, he was an orderly but he later participated in fights, was wounded twice and finally was killed in action during the battle for Iziaslav. He received the Order of the Patriotic War 1st class and the Medal "Partisan of the Patriotic War".

In 1957, a film devoted to him was shot. In 1958, he posthumously received the rank of the Hero of Soviet Union. Later, a number of streets, pioneer teams, schools and steamships were named after him, and a number of monuments were erected.

In November 2022, as part of a derussification campaign, (the Ukrainian capital) Kyiv's Valentin Kotyk Street was renamed to Videnska (Vienna) street.

References

External links

 Death of the Kotyk
 Valya Kotyk, bio
 Pioneer-Heroes
 Pioneer-Heroes

Heroes of the Soviet Union
Soviet military personnel killed in World War II
Soviet partisans in Ukraine
Child soldiers in World War II
Ukrainian people of World War II
1930 births
1944 deaths
People from Khmelnytskyi Oblast
Ukrainian anti-fascists